Mom and Dad or Mom & Dad may refer to:

Parents
Mom and Dad (1945 film), an American film
Mom and Dad (2017 film), a 2017 American horror film directed by Brian Taylor
"Mom and Dad" (How I Met Your Mother), an episode of the television series How I Met Your Mother
Mom and Dad, a 1998 EP by the Swedish rock group The Bear Quartet
The Mom and Dads, an American folk music group

See also
"Mum and Dad", a 1977 reggae single by Louisa Mark (credited as "Louisa Marks")
Mum & Dad, a 2008 British horror film
Mother and Father (disambiguation)